Bill Greentree (born 12 December 1969) is an Australian former professional rugby league footballer who played for the Parramatta Eels.

Greentree, a hooker, came to Parramatta via Dubbo and was a NSW Schoolboys representative player. He debuted in first-grade in round 10 of the 1990 NSWRL season, initially playing off the bench. When he made his first appearance as starting hooker five rounds later he scored two tries, as the Eels defeated the Gold Coast by 40 points. He remained with Parramatta until 1993, amassing 27 NSWRL games.

References

External links
Bill Greentree at Rugby League project

1969 births
Living people
Australian rugby league players
Parramatta Eels players
Rugby league players from New South Wales
Rugby league hookers